Each team in the 2019 FIFA Club World Cup had to name a 23-man squad (three of whom must be goalkeepers). FIFA announced the squads on 5 December 2019.

Al-Hilal
On 11 December 2019, Nawaf Al-Abed replaced the injured Salman Al-Faraj.

Manager:  Răzvan Lucescu

Al-Sadd

Manager:  Xavi

Espérance de Tunis

Manager:  Moïne Chaâbani

Flamengo

Manager:  Jorge Jesus

Hienghène Sport

Manager:  Félix Tagawa

Liverpool
Liverpool initially named Dejan Lovren and Rhian Brewster in their squad, but they were subsequently not named in the contingent that travelled to Qatar. They subsequently added Ki-Jana Hoever and Sepp van den Berg to their squad, who flew out alongside Harvey Elliott following Liverpool's EFL League Cup quarter-final on 17 December.

Manager:  Jürgen Klopp

Monterrey

On 13 December 2019, William Mejía replaced the injured Vincent Janssen.

Manager:  Antonio Mohamed

References

External links
 Official FIFA Club World Cup website

Squads
FIFA Club World Cup squads